The FIBA Africa Championship 1965, was the third FIBA Africa Championship regional basketball championship held by FIBA Africa. It was held in Tunisia between 28 March and 2 April 1965. Five national teams entered the event under the auspices of FIBA Africa, the sport's regional governing body. The city of Tunis hosted the tournament. Morocco won their first title after finishing in first place of the round robin group.

Results
All five teams competed in a round robin group that defined the final standings.

|}

External links
 1965 African Championship for Men, FIBA.com.

B
1965 in African basketball
AfroBasket
B
March 1965 sports events in Africa
April 1965 sports events in Africa